We Gotta Get Out of This Place is Angelic Upstarts's second album, released in 1980. The album was dedicated to Jimmy Laurenson "the best friend and workmate anyone would wish for. We will never forget. Rest in Peace Jim."

Track listing
All songs written by Thomas Mensforth and Ray Cowie, except where noted.

Side A
 "Never 'Ad Nothin'" - 2.46
 "Police Oppression" - 3.14
 "Lonely Man of Spandau" - 2.49
 "Their Destiny Is Coming" - 2.42
 "Shotgun Solution" (Mensforth, Keith "Stix" Warrington) - 2.17
 "King Coal" (Mensforth, Cowie, Warrington, Taylor) - 3.38
Side B
 "Out of Control" - 2.24
 "Ronnie is a Rocker" - 2.31
 "Listen To The Steps" (Mensforth, Cowie, Warrington, Taylor) - 2.36
 "Can't Kill a Legend" - 3.10
 "Capital City" (Mensforth, Cowie, Warrington) - 3.06
 "We Gotta Get Out of This Place" (Barry Mann, Cynthia Weil) - 4.02
Bonus tracks
"Nowhere Left to Hide"
"Unsung Heroes II"

Personnel
Angelic Upstarts
Thomas "Mensi" Mensforth - vocals
Ray "Mond" Cowie - guitar
Steve Forsten - bass guitar 
Keith "Stix" Warrington - drums
with:
Jim "Fingers" Reilly, Pete Wilson - piano
Angela, Barry, Kevin, Melvin, Phil, Spud the Starjet, Vandepeer, Zippy - backing vocals
Nick Hockley - design, illustration

References

1980 albums
Angelic Upstarts albums
Warner Records albums